Saros cycle series 162 for solar eclipses occurs at the Moon's descending node, repeating every 18 years, 11 days, starts in 2257, contains 42 events before 3000 AD, with its last event in 3501. All eclipses in this series occurs at the Moon's descending node.

This solar saros is linked to Lunar Saros 155.

Umbral eclipses
Umbral eclipses (annular, total and hybrid) can be further classified as either: 1) Central (two limits), 2) Central (one limit) or 3) Non-Central (one limit). The statistical distribution of these classes in Saros series 162 appears in the following table.

Events

References 
 http://eclipse.gsfc.nasa.gov/SEsaros/SEsaros162.html

External links
Saros cycle 162 - Information and visualization

Solar saros series